Powderhorn is a community in Minneapolis, which consists of eight different neighborhoods.

Neighborhoods in the Powderhorn community

Bancroft
Bryant
Central
Corcoran
Lyndale
Powderhorn Park
Standish
Whittier

While most of Powderhorn is east of Interstate 35W and south of Lake Street, both the Lyndale and Whittier neighborhoods are west of I-35W, while Whittier is also north of Lake Street.

See also 
 38th Street (Minneapolis)
 George Floyd Square

References

External links
Minneapolis Neighborhood Profile - Bryant
Bryant Neighborhood Organization
Minneapolis Neighborhood Profile - Lyndale
Lyndale Neighborhood Association

Communities in Minneapolis